Gregory L. Masiello is a United States Marine Corps major general who has served as the Program Executive Officer for Air Anti-Submarine Warfare, Assault, and Special Mission of the Naval Air Systems Command since May 7, 2018. Previously, he served as the Assistant Commander for Logistics and Industrial Operations of the Naval Air Systems Command from November 2015 to May 2018.

References

External links

Year of birth missing (living people)
Living people
United States Naval Academy alumni
Place of birth missing (living people)
United States Marine Corps generals